Tell Me You Love Me is an American cable television drama series that premiered on HBO and The Movie Network on September 9, 2007.

The series was created by Cynthia Mort and originally conceived as Sexlife. The pilot episode was produced and directed by Patricia Rozema and shot in Winnipeg, Manitoba. The series was picked up by HBO for a second season in October 2007, but was ultimately canceled in July 2008 when Mort said she and the network "were unable to find the direction of the show for the second season".

Overview
Tell Me You Love Me revolves around three couples, Jamie and Hugo (Borth and Kirby), Katie and David (Walker and DeKay), and Carolyn and Palek (Walger and Scott), each with their own problems concerning intimacy in their relationships. They seek the help of therapist May Foster (Alexander), who herself has relationship problems with her partner Arthur (Selby).

Cast

Regular cast
Jane Alexander as Dr. May Foster
Michelle Borth as Jamie
Tim DeKay as David
Aislinn Paul as Isabella
Adam Scott as Palek
Katharine Towne as Mason
Sonya Walger as Carolyn
Ally Walker as Katie
Julie Mond as Nicole

Recurring guest stars
David Selby as Arthur Foster
Luke Kirby as Hugo
Ryan Wynott as Joshua
Ian Somerhalder as Nick
Sherry Stringfield as Rita
Ronny Cox as John

Structure

Each episode screens without any introduction, no title cards, and no opening credits. The episodes are also shot with handheld cameras, giving the show a somewhat documentary-like feel. No episode has a music score or soundtrack, except for one song which generally starts in the last two to three scenes and carries over the closing credits. The title card for the show is not shown until immediately before the closing credits.

Depiction of sex
The series gained early publicity because of its extremely realistic depictions of sexual intercourse, oral sex and masturbation. Despite persistent rumors to the contrary, and a notable lack of comment on the matter from either HBO or the production team, the sex scenes were simulated. Director Patricia Rozema was among those to have addressed this issue directly:

With regard to these controversial scenes actress Jane Alexander has said the following:

Reception
Times James Poniewozik named it one of the Top 10 New TV Series of 2007, ranking it at #3.

The first episode of the show only attracted a total of about 910,000 viewers—far fewer than what the network had been pulling in for previous series such as Rome, Deadwood, and even the ill-fated John from Cincinnati. A month after its debut, HBO claimed the show had drawn a total of 3.1 million viewers across seven broadcasts.

Home media

References

External links
Overview of Tell Me You Love Me: "Everything About HBO's Tell Me You Love Me"
 

2007 American television series debuts
2007 American television series endings
2000s American drama television series
HBO original programming
Crave original programming
Television shows set in Manitoba
Television shows filmed in Winnipeg
English-language television shows